Gömü is a town (belde) and municipality in the Emirdağ District, Afyonkarahisar Province, Turkey. Its population is 2,139 (2021). It consists of 5 quarters: Fatih, Dörtyol, Bağlarbaşi, Toki and Gökçeyaka.

References

Populated places in Emirdağ District
Towns in Turkey